was a vice-admiral in the Imperial Japanese Navy (IJN) during World War II. Mikawa was the commander of a heavy cruiser force that won a spectacular IJN victory over the U.S. Navy and the Royal Australian Navy at the Battle of Savo Island in Ironbottom Sound on the night of 8–9 August 1942.

In this battle, his squadron of cruisers, plus one destroyer, sank three USN cruisers, plus the RAN heavy cruiser ; Mikawa's force suffered no losses in the actual battle, although heavy cruiser Kako was sunk by the undetected American submarine  on the return to their base near Rabaul in the Bismarck Archipelago. However, his later career was of mixed success, and he was reassigned to lesser posts after the loss of a troop convoy destined for New Guinea. After the war Mikawa retired back to Japan, where he died in 1981 at the age of 92.

Early career
Mikawa was a native of Hiroshima prefecture. He graduated from the 38th class of the Imperial Japanese Naval Academy in 1910, ranked third of his class of 149 cadets. In late 1914, he joined the cruiser  for World War I duty, including a cruise to China. This was followed by tours in the destroyer  and transport Seito and studies at the Japanese Naval War College.

From 1919 to 1920, Lieutenant Mikawa was attached to the Japanese delegation to the post-war Versailles Peace Treaty Conference in France.

He was subsequently an instructor at the Naval Torpedo School and held several other highly visible posts. At the end of the decade, Commander Mikawa was part of the delegation to the London Naval Treaty and shortly thereafter became naval attaché in Paris. Promoted to the rank of captain in late 1930, he returned to Japan to take up administrative and training duties.

Mikawa was promoted to rear admiral on 1 December 1936.

From 1 December 1936 – 15 November 1937, he was chief of staff of the IJN 2nd Fleet. Mikawa had duty with the Imperial Japanese Navy General Staff and Imperial General Headquarters from 1937 to 1939, then went to sea again to command a succession of fleet squadrons, first in cruisers and then in battleships. He was promoted to vice admiral on 15 November 1940.

World War II
At the time of the attack on Pearl Harbor, Mikawa was in command of Battleship Division 3 (BatDiv 3). He personally led the first section of his division as part of the screening force for the Pearl Harbor attack force, while the remaining battleships were sent south to cover the landings of Japanese troops in Malaya. Mikawa likewise led from the front during the Indian Ocean Raid and the Battle of Midway.

From 14 July 1942 to 1 April 1943, Mikawa commanded the newly formed IJN 8th Fleet in the South Pacific Ocean, based primarily at the major bases at Rabaul on the island of New Britain and Kavieng on New Ireland. During that time, he led Japanese naval forces involved in the Guadalcanal Campaign and the Solomon Islands Campaign. On the night of 8 to 9 August 1942, Mikawa commanded a force of heavy cruisers, plus one destroyer, that heavily defeated the U.S. Navy warship force, plus one Royal Australian Navy cruiser, in the Battle of Savo Island in Ironbottom Sound off Guadalcanal.

However, Mikawa was somewhat criticized by his superiors for his failure to aggressively follow up on his victory. He could have pursued to the south and attacked the fleet of unarmed American cargo transports that were at anchor, waiting until daybreak when they could continue delivering ammunition and supplies to the American 1st Marine Division, which had landed on Guadalcanal on 8 August 1942. Instead, Mikawa decided to turn northward and retire back to the safety of his base at Rabaul. Mikawa's only ship that was sunk or badly damaged was the cruiser , which was torpedoed and sunk by the U.S. Navy submarine  on their voyage back to Rabaul. However, after the war Mikawa maintained that based on the information available to him at the time, he did not believe he had made an incorrect decision in withdrawing from Savo Island.

On the night of 13 to 14 November 1942, Mikawa led a cruiser force that bombarded the critical American air base of Henderson Field on Guadalcanal during the Naval Battle of Guadalcanal, but the next day lost one retreating heavy cruiser to air attacks originating there. Throughout the campaign for Guadalcanal, Rear Admiral Raizō Tanaka often commanded the nighttime runs of the "Tokyo Express", fast warships that delivered soldiers and supplies to Japanese Army force on Guadalcanal. However, Mikawa's attempt to land Japanese reinforcements to the base of Lae on New Guinea turned into the disastrous (for the Japanese) Battle of the Bismarck Sea, one that involved only Japanese surface ships versus American and Royal Australian Air Force land-based airplanes.

Mikawa was soon forced to take responsibility for the loss of most of the Solomon Islands, and he was reassigned to rear areas, such as the Philippines. Admiral Mikawa also stated to the High Command of the IJN that fighting the Americans for the Solomon Islands was simply pouring Japanese soldiers, sailor, airmen, and ships into a "black hole". Mikawa was correct about this, but his superiors in the IJN, and the generals of the Japanese Army refused to listen to him.

Mikawa had Naval General Staff and other shore posts in Japan from April to September 1943. From 3 September 1943 to 18 June 1944, Mikawa commanded the 2nd Southern Expeditionary Fleet in the Philippines. Afterwards, he commanded the very small "Southwest Area Fleet" and the very depleted "13th Air Fleet" from 18 June to 1 November 1944, also in the Philippines. By this time, the writing was on the wall that Japan faced only defeat after defeat until it would be forced to surrender. Reassigned to shore duty in Japan following the Battle of Leyte Gulf in October 1944, Mikawa retired from active duty with the IJN in May 1945.

Postwar and final days
After the war, Admiral Mikawa lived a long and rather quiet life in Japan, dying in 1981 at the age of 92.

Mikawa and the Long Lance torpedo were commemorated in 1992 by a commemorative postage stamp issued by the Republic of the Marshall Islands. Mikawa's character also appeared in the 1970 American/Japanese war film Tora! Tora! Tora!, where he was portrayed by the Japanese actor Fujio Suga.

References

Books

External links 
Naval Historical Center biography of Gunichi Mikawa 
FUTURA DTP biography of Gunichi Mikawa

Notes

1888 births
1981 deaths
Military personnel from Hiroshima Prefecture
Battle of Midway
Japanese admirals of World War II
Imperial Japanese Navy admirals
Japanese naval attachés
Imperial Japanese Naval Academy alumni